Inserts is a 1975 British comedy-drama film written and directed by John Byrum in his directorial debut, and starring Richard Dreyfuss, Jessica Harper, Bob Hoskins and Veronica Cartwright.

The plot concerns actors and directors in the early 1930s who were unable to make the transition from silent films to talkies, and thus turned to making pornography. The film's title takes its name from the double meaning that "insert" both refers to a film technique and sexual intercourse. Inserts was filmed in the vein of a one-act stage play on one set and filmed entirely in real time.

Plot

Prior to the opening credits we see portions of the stag film that is shot in the course of the movie.  Voices are overheard that make it apparent that men and women are watching this in the present day.  At the end a man complains that there was no "cum shot", something that will later develop into a plot point.

The story takes place in Hollywood in the early 1930s, shortly after the start of the talkie period. A visionary and gifted young Hollywood director known as Boy Wonder (Richard Dreyfuss) has fallen out of favour with the studios. This is ostensibly due to his reluctance to lower his standards or abandon his artistic and experimental style, such as using a hand-held camera, for the sake of churning out lesser quality stag films for easy money, due to his alcoholism and his fear of leaving his house. He works out of his decaying mansion, which is the only one left on a street being turned into a freeway.

On the morning of this particular shoot, a heroin-addicted waitress named Harlene (Veronica Cartwright) arrives. Harlene was once a well-known and respected star during the silent film era, and she too is reluctant to join the ranks of the "talkies" due in part to her unappealing, high-pitched squeaky voice. She is now the star in the first of his six-picture deal. She prepares and shoots heroin while Boy Wonder drinks heavily during a conversation about the changing times in Hollywood.

An actor called Rex the Wonder Dog (Stephen Davies) soon arrives, wearing a white suit with grass stains on his knees, having just come from his job working for a mortician. During his introduction, Rex gullibly believes a man from a studio who that says that he will put him in the mainstream talkies, and has an appointment to meet him in his hotel room later that same day.

Boy Wonder awkwardly attempts to make an artistic film using an actress under the influence of heroin and an actor who becomes increasingly frustrated with the director and all of his poetic talk, much of which he admits he doesn't understand. The scene goes wrong when Rex gets out of control during the action and Boy Wonder needs to smash a wine bottle over his head to get him to stop.

Just then Big Mac (Bob Hoskins), a porno film producer, enters the scene. He has small heroin packets in his jacket pocket, an unlit cigar in his mouth, wads of money for Rex and a pretty wannabe actress named Cathy Cake (Jessica Harper) hanging on his arm. Harlene takes her payment in heroin and soon dies from an overdose in an upstairs bedroom. Rex finds the dead body, and everyone is terribly upset over this turn of events. Boy Wonder talks about continuing his film, but Rex refuses to perform with a dead woman.

Big Mac offers Rex a part in a mainstream movie in order to convince Rex to help him bury the body and, while the two are away, Cathy and Boy Wonder develop a chemistry that eventually leads to another ironic high point in the film. Boy Wonder offers to film Cathy for insert shots of her nude body to double for the late Harlene. At first, Cathy refuses to undress, but when she does, she soon becomes aroused by Boy Wonder filming her. After a while, he makes love to her believing he has found something of a soulmate, but she is disappointed when she learns the camera was off. Boy Wonder's sexual experience with Cathy marked the end of his longstanding problem with impotence, which was evidently related to his emotional problems.

Boy Wonder quickly realizes that this romantic encounter was simply a ploy to get her into the film, and that she has used and directed him the way he used and directed her. Big Mac and Rex return to find both of them half naked. In a jealous rage, Big Mac ends his six-picture stag film contract with Boy Wonder, who by this time is completely drunk. Rex beats up Boy Wonder in retribution for hitting him earlier with the wine bottle by doing likewise. Big Mac takes the film reel that Boy Wonder used and leaves with Rex and Cathy. After Boy Wonder is left alone in his home, a man knocks at the door. This is Clark Gable, a then little-known actor who had been said to be intending to call on Boy Wonder about a film project. Boy Wonder will not answer the door, and after a short time the unseen man leaves. The end of the film finds Boy Wonder alone in his spacious living room, sitting in the same place where the film began; playing piano and singing, pondering what he'll eat for lunch.

This last remark brings home the fact that, while a great deal has occurred in the course of the film, the movie was shot in real time.

Cast
 Richard Dreyfuss as Boy Wonder
 Jessica Harper as Cathy Cake
 Veronica Cartwright as Harlene
 Bob Hoskins as Big Mac
 Stephen Davies as Rex

Production
The film was originally written in 1972. John Byrum felt his career was, in his words, "going nowhere fast. I was asked to write a porn film but I couldn't so instead I wrote a film about trying to write in the porno genre. It's a very personal film."

Byrum was unable to raise finance but the script was read by Tony Bill who then hired Byrum to write Harry and Walter Go to New York. When this script was sold for $500,000, Byrum was considered "hot" and he was able to raise finance for Inserts. The money came from United Artists, Devina Belling, Clive Parsons and star Richard Dreyfuss, who had just made Jaws. (Belling and Parsons helped finance Harry and Walter.) The film was made in London over three weeks on a budget of $350,000 of which $150,000 went to Dreyfuss.

Byrum said the film "would probably have been better accepted ten years ago but whether people love or hate the movie they should know that everyone involved made a commitment and believed in it."

The film involved waist-up nude scenes from Jessica Harper, and full frontal nudity from Veronica Cartwright and Stephen Davies.

Release
The film was originally given an X rating. Richard Dreyfuss personally appealed the decision. "We knew it would be controversial but had no idea it would get an X rating," said Belling. "It is a film about survival, ambition and fear of rejection but nobody seems to understand that."

Reception

Critical
Roger Ebert gave Inserts 2.5 stars out of a possible 4, writing that the film's dialogue was stilted and the setting not entirely convincing, but that Dreyfuss and Cartwright gave effective performances and the film "has a certain quirky charm." Gene Siskel of the Chicago Tribune awarded an identical 2.5-star grade and observed, "You can tell the film was directed by a writer. Many times it reads like a play, one of those plays in which dialog always echoes earlier dialog. But that's where Dreyfuss' energy rescues the film. He supplies the rough edge that busts up the concocted script." Vincent Canby of The New York Times thought that the film was "essentially a stunt, a slapstick melodrama in the form of a one-act, one-set, five-character play. It is, however, a very clever, smart-mouthed stunt that, in its self-described 'degenerate' way, recalls more accurately aspects of old Hollywood than any number of other period films, including 'Gable and Lombard.'" A review in Variety declared, "Chalk up Byrum as a director with a good flair for handling actors, with Jessica Harper scoring as the shrewd innocent and Stephen Davies and Bob Hoskins right as the more flamboyant stud actor and boss respectively. But it is all somewhat too surface despite its possible allusions to highly fictionalized real Hollywood '30s types." Kevin Thomas of the Los Angeles Times called it "one of those pictures that's absolutely determined to tell it like it was—or still is. But writer-director John Byrum is so intent on this it apparently never occurred to him that he really doesn't have anything to say that isn't already pretty well known—mainly, that Hollywood could be/can be a pretty sordid place, endlessly deceptive even to the most jaded."

Gary Arnold of The Washington Post panned the film as "one of those trashy concepts with nowhere to go but back to the trash heap. The sooner this sordid and pretentious fiasco drops out of sight, the better it will be for several promising careers, particularly the career of Richard Dreyfuss, who has committed a formidable artistic faux pas by hitching his lively, ascendant star to a worthless vehicle." Pauline Kael of The New Yorker stated, "Byrum is only twenty-eight, and this film was made (in England) on a small budget (around a half million). Still, the Boy Wonder's callow paradoxes ('Nothing pure, old sport, is ever simple,' followed by 'Nothing simple is ever pure') and the pearls of condescending wisdom that he drops are pure juvenilia." Tom Milne of The Monthly Film Bulletin wrote that early on "Inserts looks as though it might be going somewhere as a reflection on Hollywood's fall from dream factory to second-hand porn pusher," but then "the script wanders well out of its depth into some turgid ruminations about artistic integrity versus commercial opportunism, simultaneously taking the opportunity to indulge a little titillation until the whole thing begins to founder with embarrassed self-mockery into routine sexploitation."

The film holds a score of 67% on Rotten Tomatoes based on 12 reviews, with an average rating of 5.8/10.

Box office
The film was a box office disappointment.

Stage production
The three producers felt the material would work as a play and Byrum agreed. He adapted the script into a play and it debuted in New York in 1982 starring Kevin O'Connor.

Reception
Mel Gussow of The New York Times said "the play takes itself far too seriously while festooning the stage with turgid dialogue and tawdry situations."  Walter Kerr of the same publication called it a " dreadful little piece".

References

External links 
 
 

1975 films
1975 comedy-drama films
British comedy-drama films
Films about filmmaking
Films about pornography
Films set in 1930
Films set in Los Angeles
United Artists films
1975 directorial debut films
1970s English-language films
Films directed by John Byrum
1970s British films